Robert  Standish (born September 18, 1964,  Los Angeles, California) is an American artist.

Standish received a BA in psychology from Antioch University in 1996. Standish's debut painting exhibition took place in Los Angeles in 2002 at lemon sky: projects + editions, a gallery which provided the artist with his very first solo exhibit, receiving a highly favorable review in various publications including FlashArt magazine. lemon sky gallery was the first to place the artist's work with important collectors, such as Los Angeles Collector, Dan Fauci and the Manilows. More recently, Standish was positively profiled in Juxtapoz Art & Culture Magazine. Works by Standish are in the collection of noted art collector Lewis Manilow, and in the collection of the Los Angeles County Museum of Art (LACMA). A November 2008 show by Standish at the Carrie Secrist Gallery of Chicago, Illinois garnered a positive review from the Chicago Tribune, which reported that "Standish's use of logos suggests ironic social commentary, as if, say, Nike or Citibank were 'sponsors' of his street people. It's an oddity one puts up with for the sake of his dazed, tremulous nocturnal vision".

External links
Website of Robert Standish

References

1964 births
Living people
Artists from California
Antioch University alumni